Shadows of Paris may refer to:
 Shadows of Paris (1924 film), an American silent drama film
 Shadows of Paris (1932 film), a French film